Romolo Ferri (23 November 1928 – 13 May 2015) was an Italian Grand Prix motorcycle road racer. He had his most successful year in 1956, when he won the 125cc German Grand Prix and finished the season in second place behind Carlo Ubbiali.

References

1928 births
2015 deaths
Italian motorcycle racers
125cc World Championship riders
250cc World Championship riders
Isle of Man TT riders